PTCC may refer to:

 Philippine Touring Car Championship, a competition in the Philippines
 Pine Technical College, a college in the United States
 Pingtung County Council, a council in Taiwan